Paul Woolley (16 March 1902 – 17 March 1984) was professor of Church history at Westminster Theological Seminary from its inception in 1929 until his retirement in 1977.

Woolley studied at Princeton University and Princeton Theological Seminary. He was a minister of the Presbyterian Church in the United States of America, but left to form the Orthodox Presbyterian Church in 1936.

In 1982, a Festschrift was published in his honor. John Calvin: His Influence in the Western World was edited by W. Stanford Reid and included contributions from Robert Godfrey, Philip Edgcumbe Hughes, George Marsden, and R. T. Kendall.

The Paul Woolley Chair of Church History at Westminster Theological Seminary is named in his honor.

References

1902 births
1984 deaths
Historians of Christianity
Princeton University alumni
Princeton Theological Seminary alumni
Westminster Theological Seminary faculty
Orthodox Presbyterian Church ministers
20th-century American historians
American historians of religion
20th-century American clergy